Alan Mikhail (born 1979) is an American historian who is a professor of history at Yale University. His work centers on the history of the Ottoman Empire.

Education 
Mikhail graduated in History and Chemistry from Rice University in 2001, and received his MA in history from the University of California, Berkeley in 2003. His PhD was conferred from the same university in 2008. His thesis The Nature of Ottoman Egypt: Irrigation, Environment, and Bureaucracy in the Long Eighteenth Century was awarded the Malcolm H. Kerr Dissertation Award in the Social Sciences (2009) by Middle East Studies Association of North America (MESA).

Career 
He served as a postdoctoral scholar at Stanford University for two years, before becoming an assistant professor of history at Yale University in 2010. In 2013, he was promoted to full professor and became department chair in 2018.

Works and Reception

Nature and Empire in Ottoman Egypt 
His first monograph, Nature and Empire in Ottoman Egypt (2011), was a part of the Cambridge University Press series Studies in Environment and History. Based on his doctoral dissertation, the book argues for using an environmental lens to understand relations between the Ottoman Empire and the province of Egypt. It received a positive reception and won the Roger Owen Book Award from MESA for the best book in two years in economics, economic history, or the political economy of the Middle East and North Africa.

The Animal in Ottoman Egypt 
The Animal in Ottoman Egypt, published in 2014 by Oxford University Press, examines Egypt's changing place in the Ottoman Empire and world economy from the sixteenth to the nineteenth centuries through human-animal relations. Scholarly reception was mixed. It received the Gustav Ranis International Book Prize for being the best book on an international topic by a Yale ladder faculty member.

Under Osman's Tree 
Under Osman's Tree, published by the University of Chicago Press in 2017, received critical acclaim and was awarded the M. Fuat Köprülü Book Prize of the Ottoman and Turkish Studies Association.

God's Shadow 
God's Shadow was published by Liveright (an imprint of the trade publisher W. W. Norton) in August, 2020. The book argues for the central place of the Ottoman Empire in world history using the life and times of Selim I. The book garnered mostly positive reviews in newspapers. In contrast, scholarly reception was very poor.

An Ottoman historian, Caroline Finkel characterized its assertions as "overblown". Cornell Fleischer, Cemal Kafadar, and Sanjay Subrahmanyam identified numerous factual and interpretational errors and described the work as a "tissue of falsehoods, half-truths, and absurd speculations." A month later, they penned a rejoinder—in response to an article where Efe Khayyat and Ariel Salzmann questioned their motives behind writing an acerbic review—which expanded on the list of Mikhail's factual errors, misrepresentations, and unorthodox scholarly practices, such as a reliance on Wikipedia articles. Abdürrahim Özer of Bilkent University has since identified a long list of factual errors and misinterpretations in the book. Ali Balci found the work to contain "some excessive comments for the sake of making Selim a part of the global history."

Water on Sand: Environmental Histories of the Middle East and North Africa 
Water on Sand, published by Oxford University Press in 2013, was met with positive reviews.

My Egypt Archive 
My Egypt Archive, Yale University Press, 2023. 
Depict a decade (2010-2001) Mikhail  spend as a young researcher at National Archives of Egypt.

Honors 
In 2018, he received the Anneliese Maier Research Award of the Alexander von Humboldt Foundation.

References

External links 
 
Yale faculty page

21st-century American historians
Yale University faculty
Living people
1979 births